The Chaira Pumped Storage Hydro Power Plant (Chaira PSHPP) was built in the Rila mountains, about  southeast of Bulgaria's capital city, Sofia.
Units 1 and 2 have been in operation since 1995, and at that time Chaira was the largest pumped-storage plant in southeast Europe with the highest head in the world for a single-stage pump turbine ( generating and  pumping). Units 3 and 4 came online in 1999. 
The pump-turbines and motor-generators were supplied by Toshiba, and three of them were manufactured under Japanese supervision in Bulgaria. Outflow from the Belmeken reservoir supplies the Sestrimo Hydro Power Plant

References

Energy infrastructure completed in 1995
1995 establishments in Bulgaria
Hydroelectric power stations in Bulgaria
Buildings and structures in Pazardzhik Province
Pumped-storage hydroelectric power stations in Bulgaria